The Dublin Bus/Evening Herald Dubs Stars Football/Hurling are the players chosen as the top Gaelic football and hurling players in their given position in the year that the Blue stars awards are awarded. The Dublin Blue Stars are a similar award to the GAA All Stars Awards which are awarded annually by the Gaelic Athletic Association. Dublin traditionally play against the Blue stars team in a challenge match, which proves to be an opportunity to see and try out new players for the Dublin football and Hurling teams.

The 2006 Blues Star football challenge match ended with Dublin winning the game by a scoreline of 3–17 to 0–12. The 2006 Blue Star Hurling match was also won by Dublin, the game finished on a scoreline of 2–19 to 0–10. Both 2007 Blue Stars games finished level at full-time and both games were forced into penalties and the Blue Stars won on both occasions.

2007 Football Blue Stars Winners

Goalkeeper
 Michael Savage (St Vincents)

Full Backs
 Paul Griffin (Kilmacud Crokes)
 Martin Cahill (St Brigids)
 Paul Conlon (St Vincents)

Half Backs
 Chris Guckian (St Judes)
 Kevin Nolan (Kilmacud Crokes)
 Ger Brennan (St Vincents)

Midfield
 Michael O'Shea (St Vincents)
 Ken Darcy (St Brigids)

Half Forwards
 Brendan McMenamin (St Judes)
 Mark Vaughan (Kilmacud Crokes)
 Gareth Smith (St Oliver Plunkett's/ER)

Full Forwards
 Kevin Bonner (St Brigids)
 Tomás Quinn (St Vincent's)
 Bernard Brogan (St Oliver Plunkett's/ER)

Substitutes 
 Dan Nelligan (Kilmacud Crokes)
 Eoin Brady (St Vincents)
 Paul Brogan (St Oliver Plunketts/ER)
 Barry Cahill (St Brigids)
 Paddy Andrews (St Brigids)
 Kevin McMenamin (St Judes)

2006 Football Blue Stars
Stephen Gallagher (UCD)
Willie Lowry (St. Vincent's)
Paddy Navin (UCD)
John McCarthy (UCD)
P. Griffin (Kilmacud Crokes)
G. Brennan (St Vincent's)
C. Goggins (Ballinteer St Johns)
P. Gilroy (St Vincent's)
Sean Brady (UCD)
B. Sheehan (UCD)
A. Brogan (St Oliver Plunkett's/ER)
A. O'Malley (UCD)
D. Connolly (St Vincent's)
T. Quinn (St Vincent's)
B. Brogan (St Oliver Plunkett's/ER)

Substitutes
P. Copeland (St Judes)
Brian Kirby (Thomas Davis)
Micheal Lyons (St Judes)
D. Murray (Round Towers, Clondalkin)
Tommy Brennan (Lucan Sarsfields)
M. Davoren (Kilmacud Crokes)
D. Farrell (Na Fianna)

2007 Hurling Blue Stars

Goalkeeper
 G. Maguire (Ballyboden St Endas)

Full Backs 
 Cathal Ryan (Ballyboden St Endas)
 Stephen Perkins (Ballyboden St Endas)
 Ruairí Trainor (St Vincent's)

Half Backs
S. Hiney (Ballyboden St Endas)
 Rónán Fallon (St Vincent's)
 T. Brady (North Dublin 2, Na Fianna)

Midfielders
 Malachy Travers (Ballyboden St Endas)
 A. McCrabbe (Craobh Chiaráin)

Half Forwards
 Dave Sweeney (Ballyboden St Endas)
 Damien Russell (St Vincent's)
 Michael Griffin (Ballyboden St Endas)

Full Forwards
 Fintan Clandillon (Lucan Sarsfields)
 C. Keaney (Ballyboden St Endas)
 Kevin Flynn (O'Toole's)

Substitutes
 Alan Nolan (St Brigids)
 Cronan Dooley (Lucan Sarsfields)
 Tom Russell (St Vincent's)
 Tim Sweeney (Ballyboden St Endas)
 Michael Carton (O'Toole's)
 James Doody (Ballyboden St Endas)

2006 Hurling Blue Stars
A. Nolan (St Brigid's)
Tom Russell (St Vincent's)
Stephen Perkins (Ballyboden St Endas)
Cathal Ryan (Ballyboden St Endas)
D. O'Reilly (Craobh Chiaráin)
R. Fallon (St Vincent's)
David Kirwan (Craobh Chiaráin)
Damien Russell (St Vincent's)
Johnny McGuirk (Craobh Chiaráin)
A. McCrabbe (Craobh Chiaráin)
D. Curtin (Ballyboden St Endas)
D. Connolly (St Vincent's)
D. O'Callaghan (St Mark's)
Ger Ennis (Craobh Chiaráin)
K. Flynn (O'Toole's)

Substitute awards
Stephen Chester (Craobh Chiaráin)
Cormac de Frein (Kilmacud Crokes)
Kevin Ryan (O'Toole's)
Fergal Armstrong (Kilmacud Crokes)
Eoghan Dunne (Cuala)
K. O'Reilly (Lucan Sarsfields)
M. Carton (O'Toole's)

References

Dublin GAA
The Herald (Ireland)
Gaelic games awards
Lists of hurling players
Lists of Gaelic football players